Avey Field State Airport  is a public use airport located on the Canada–US border at Laurier, in Ferry County, Washington, United States. It is privately owned and operated.

Also known as Avey Field State/Laurier Airport, it is one of six airports that straddle the Canada–US border. The others are Whetstone International Airport, Coutts/Ross International Airport, International Peace Garden Airport, Piney Pinecreek Border Airport, and Coronach/Scobey Border Station Airport.

The airport is shared by the State of Washington and the Province of British Columbia. Both U.S. Customs and Border Protection and the Canada Border Services Agency have offices located nearby on U.S. Route 395 and British Columbia Highway 395 adjacent to the parking area.

The airport was managed by the Washington State Department of Transportation (Aviation Division) until August 2012, when management transferred to its private owners.

Laurier consists of the customs office and a post office. Little remains to indicate the thriving mining community of the 1890s.

History

The airport was constructed in 1962 as an emergency landing facility and was dedicated the following year by Senator Henry M. Jackson. Its sole runway extends  into Canada.

Facilities and aircraft 
The gravel runway 17–35 measures 1,975 by 40 feet (602 x 12 m). It is marked with retro-reflective devices, but both shoulders are soft and rough.

Mountains and hills surround the airport and there are trees on both approaches. An overflight to verify field conditions and to rule out obstructions (such as pedestrians, vehicles or animals) is recommended. The field is usually open from June 1 to October 1.

For the 12-month period ending December 31, 2006, the airport had 800 general aviation aircraft operations, an average of 66 per month.

References

External links
 Avey Field State Airport at WSDOT Aviation (Includes aerial photograph)

Airports in British Columbia
Airports in Washington (state)
Transportation buildings and structures in Ferry County, Washington
Boundary Country
Binational airports